The 2022–23 EFL League Two (referred to as the Sky Bet League Two for sponsorship reasons) is the 19th season of the Football League Two under its current title and the 31st season under its current league division format. It began on 30 July 2022.

Team changes 
The following teams have changed division since the 2021–22 season:

Stadiums

Personnel and sponsoring

Managerial changes

League table

Results

Season statistics

Top scorers

Hat-tricks

Monthly awards

Notes

References 

EFL League Two seasons
4
England
Current association football seasons